Bardaisan (11 July 154 – 222 AD; , Bardaiṣān), known in Arabic as Ibn Daisan (ابن ديصان) and in Latin as Bardesanes, was a Syriac-speaking Assyrian or Parthian Christian writer and teacher with a gnostic background, and founder of the Bardaisanites. A scientist, scholar, astrologer, philosopher, hymnographer, and poet, Bardaisan was also renowned for his knowledge of India, on which he wrote a book, now lost. According to the early Christian historian Eusebius, Bardaisan was at one time a follower of the gnostic Valentinus, but later opposed Valentinian gnosticism and also wrote against Marcionism.

Biography

Early life and education
Bardaisan ( bar Daiṣān "son of the Daiṣān") was a Syriac author born on 11 July 154, in Edessa, Osroene, which, in those days, was alternately under the influence of both the Roman Empire and the Parthian Empire. To indicate the city of his birth, his parents called him "Son of the Daisan", the river on which Edessa was situated. He is sometimes also referred to as "the Babylonian" (by Porphyrius); and, on account of his later important activity in Armenia, "the Armenian", (by Hippolytus of Rome), while Ephrem the Syrian calls him "philosopher of the Arameans" (Filosofā d-Arāmāyē). Some sources refer to his high birth and wealth; according to Michael the Syrian, Bardaisan's parents had fled Persia and Sextus Julius Africanus reports that he was of the Parthian nobility. His parents, Nuhama and Nah 'siram, must have been people of rank, for their son was educated with the crown-prince of Osroene at the court of Abgar VIII. Africanus says that he saw Bardaisan, with bow and arrow, mark the outline of a boy's face with his arrows on a shield which the boy held.

Owing to political disturbances in Edessa, Bardaisan and his parents moved for a while to Hierapolis (now Manbij), a strong centre of Babylonianism. Here, the boy was brought up in the house of a priest Anuduzbar. In this school he learnt all the intricacies of Babylonian astrology, a training that permanently influenced his mind and proved the bane of his later life. At the age of twenty-five he happened to hear the homilies of Hystaspes, the Bishop of Edessa, received instruction, was baptized, and even admitted to the diaconate or the priesthood. "Priesthood", however, may merely imply that he ranked as one of the college of presbyters, because Bardaisen remained in the world and had a son called Harmonius, who according to Sozomen's Ecclesiastical history, was "deeply versed in Grecian erudition, and was the first to subdue his native tongue to meters and musical laws; these verses he delivered to the choirs". When Abgar IX, the friend of his youth, ascended the throne (179), Bardaisan took his place at court. While a sincere Christian, he was clearly no ascetic, but dressed in finery "with berylls and caftan", according to Ephrem, one of his critics.

Preaching activity
Bardaisan is said to have converted prince Abgar IX to Christianity (probably after 202, i.e. after his visit and honourable reception at Rome), and even if he did not, he had an important share in Christianizing the city. Both king and philosopher laboured to create the first Christian state. However, while he showed great literary activity against Marcion and Valentinus, Bardaisan himself went to create his own heterodox Christian dogma by mixing its doctrines with Babylonian astrology. Other commentators say his philosophy ended up resembling those of Valentinus, if not adhering to them completely. Epiphanius of Salamis and Bar Hebraeus assert that he was first an orthodox Christian and afterwards an adept of Valentinus. As a gnostic, he certainly denied the resurrection of the body, and so far as we can judge by the obscure quotations from his hymns furnished by Ephrem he explained the origin of the world by a process of emanation from the supreme God whom he called the Father of the Living. His teachings formed the basis of the Manichaeism and later of the batini sects of Shia Islam.

Bardaisan and his movement were considered heretical by the Christians, and he was subjected to critical polemics. Those claimed, probably falsely, that he became a Valentinian Gnostic out of disappointed ambitions in the Christian church. In particular, he was vigorously combated by St. Ephrem who mentioned him in his hymns:

Encounter with religious men from India
Porphyry states that on one occasion at Edessa, Bardaisan interviewed an Indian deputation of holy men ( "śramaṇas") who had been sent to the Roman emperor Elagabalus or another Severan emperor, and questioned them as to the nature of Indian religion. The encounter is described in Porphyry De abstin., iv, 17 and Stobaeus (Eccles., iii, 56, 141):

Exile and death
Eventually, after 353 years of existence, the Osrhoenic kingdom came to an end by the Romans under Caracalla. Taking advantage of the anti-Christian faction in Edessa, the Romans captured Abgar IX and sent him in chains to Rome. Though he was urged by a friend of Caracalla to apostatize, Bardaisan stood firm, saying that he feared not death, as he would in any event have to undergo it, even though he should now submit to the emperor. At the age of sixty-three he was forced to take refuge in the fortress of Ani in Armenia and tried to preach there, but with little success. He also composed a history of the Armenian kings. He died at the age of sixty-eight, either at Ani or at Edessa. According to Michael the Syrian, Bardaisan had besides Harmonius two other sons, called Abgarun and Hasdu.

Bardaisanite school
The followers of Bardaisan (the Bardaisanites) continued his teachings in a sect of the 2nd century deemed heretical by later Christians. Bardaisan's son, Harmonius, is considered to have strayed farther from the path of orthodoxy. Educated at Athens, he added to the Babylonian astrology of his father Greek ideas concerning the soul, the birth and destruction of bodies and a sort of metempsychosis.

A certain Marinus, a follower of Bardaisan and a dualist, who is addressed in the "Dialogue of Adamantius", held the doctrine of a twofold primeval being; for the devil, according to him is not created by God. He was also a Docetist, as he denied Christ's birth of a woman. Bardaisan's form of gnosticism influenced Manichaeism.

St. Ephrem's zealous efforts to suppress this powerful heresy were not entirely successful. Rabbula, Bishop of Edessa in 431–432, found it flourishing everywhere. Its existence in the seventh century is attested by Jacob of Edessa; in the eighth by George, Bishop of the Arabs; in the tenth by the historian Masudi; and even in the twelfth by Shashrastani. Bardaisanism seems to have merged first into Valentinianism and then into common Manichaeism.

Doctrine
Various opinions have been formed as to the real doctrine of Bardesanes. As early as Hippolytus (Philosoph., VI, 50) his doctrine was described as a variety of Valentinianism, the most popular form of Gnosticism. Adolf Hilgenfeld in 1864 defended this view, based mainly on extracts from St. Ephrem, who devoted his life to combating Bardaisanism in Edessa. However, it has been argued that the strong and fervent expressions of St. Ephrem against the Bardaisanites of his day are not a fair criterion of the doctrine of their master. The extraordinary veneration of his own countrymen, the very reserved and half-respectful allusion to him in the early Fathers, and above all the "Book of the Laws of the Countries" suggest a milder view of Bardaisan's aberrations.

Like the Early Christians, Bardaisan believed in an Almighty God, Creator of heaven and earth, whose will is absolute, and to whom all things are subject. God endowed man with freedom of will to work out his salvation and allowed the world to be a mixture of good and evil, light and darkness. All things, even those we now consider inanimate, have a measure of liberty. In all of them the light has to overcome the darkness.

Shashrastani states: "The followers of Daisan believe in two elements, light and darkness. The light causes the good, deliberately and with free will; the darkness causes the evil, but by force of nature and necessity. They believe that light is a living thing, possessing knowledge, might, perception and understanding; and from it movement and life take their source; but that darkness is dead, ignorant, feeble, rigid and soulless, without activity and discrimination; and they hold that the evil within them is the outcome of their nature and is done without their co-operation".

He apparently denied the resurrection of the body, although he believed Christ's body was endowed with incorruptibility as with a special gift. Bardaisan postulated that after six thousand years this Earth would have an end, and a world without evil would take its place.

Bardaisan also thought the sun, moon and planets were living beings, to whom, under God, the government of this world was largely entrusted; and though man was free, he was strongly influenced for good or for evil by the constellations. According to St. Ephrem, Sun and Moon were considered male and female principles, and the ideas of heaven amongst the Bardaisanites were not without an admixture of sensuality (or "obscenities"). Led by the fact that "spirit" is feminine in Syriac, Bardaisan might have held unorthodox views on the Trinity.

Bardaisan's cosmology and commentary on it only survives in much later sources, but can be outlined as follows. The world began with the four pure and uncreated elements of light, wind, fire, water, respectively located in East, West, South, North (and are each able to move throughout their own, individual regions). Above the plane on which these four pure elements rest is the Lord, and below is the darkness. At one time and by chance, the four pure elements exceeded their boundaries and began to mix. Taking up the opportune chance, darkness also mixed with them. Distressed, the elements appeal to God to separate the darkness from them, but God is only partially successful in this procedure. The Lord uses the mix to create the world, but the remaining darkness in the mix acts as the cause of evil in the world since then and until today. The world is allotted a period of 6,000 years to exist. Purifications through conception and birth take place, but at the end of the allotted period for the Earth, a definitive purification will take place that will expunge darkness from the world.

Patristics scholar Ilaria Ramelli has argued that Bardaisan may have been one of the first Christian supporters of apokatastasis (universal restoration), citing especially the following passage in Bardaisan's Book of the Laws of Countries as evidence for his belief in this doctrine:There will come a time when even this capacity for harm that remains in [mankind] will be brought to an end by the instruction that will obtain in a different arrangement of things. And, once that new world will be constituted, all evil movements will cease, all rebellions will come to an end, and the fools will be persuaded, and the lacks will be filled, and there will be safety and peace, as a gift of the Lord of all natures.

Writings
Bardaisan apparently was a voluminous author. Though nearly all his works have perished, we find notices of the following:
 Dialogues against Marcion and Valentinus.
 Dialogue "Against Fate" addressed to an Antoninus. Whether this Antoninus is merely a friend of Bardaisan or a Roman emperor and, in the latter case, which of the Antonines is meant, is a matter of controversy. It is also uncertain whether this dialogue is identical with "The Book of the Laws of the Countries", of which later on.
 A "Book of Psalms", 150 in number, in imitation of David's Psalter. These psalms became famous in the history of Edessa; their words and melodies lived for generations on the lips of the people. Only when St. Ephrem composed hymns in the same pentasyllabic metre and had them sung to the same tunes as the psalms of Bardaisan, did the latter gradually lose favour. We probably possess a few of Bardaisan's hymns in the Gnostic Acts of Thomas; the Hymn of the Pearl (or "Hymn on the Soul"); the "Espousals of Wisdom"; the consecratory prayer at Baptism and at Holy Communion. Of these only the "Hymn of the Pearl" is generally acknowledged to be by Bardesanes, the authorship of the others is doubtful. Though marred by many obscurities, the beauty of this hymn on the soul is striking. The soul is sent from its heavenly home to the earth, symbolized by Egypt, to obtain the pearl of great price. In Egypt it forgets for a while its royal parentage and glorious destiny. It is reminded thereof by a letter from home, succeeds in snatching a raiment of light, it returns to receive its rank and glory in the kingdom of its father.
 Astrologico-theological treatises, in which his peculiar tenets were expounded. They are referred to by St. Ephrem, and amongst them was a treatise on light and darkness. A fragment of an astronomical work by Bardaisan was preserved by George, Bishop of the Arab tribes, and republished by Nau.
 A "History of Armenia". Moses of Chorene states that Bardaisan, "having taken refuge in the fortress of Ani, read there the temple records in which also the deeds of kings were chronicled; to these he added the events of his own time. He wrote all in Syriac, but his book was afterwards translated into Greek". Though the correctness of this statement is not quite above suspicion, it probably has a foundation in fact.
 "An Account of India". Bardaisan obtained his information from the Indian śramaṇas (wandering ascetic) ambassadors to the Roman Emperor Elagabalus. A few extracts are preserved by Porphyry and Stobaeus.
"Book of the Laws of the Countries". This famous dialogue, the oldest remnant not only of Bardaisanite learning, but even of Syriac literature, if we except the version of Holy Writ, is not by Bardaisan himself, but by a certain Philip, his disciple. The main speaker, however, in the dialogue is Bardaisan, and we have no reason to doubt that what is put in his mouth correctly represents his teaching. Excerpts of this work are extant in Greek in Eusebius and in Caesarius; in Latin in the "Recognitions" of Pseudo-Clement A complete Syriac text was first published from a sixth- or seventh-century manuscript in the British Museum by William Cureton, in his Spicilegium Syriacum (London, 1855), and by Nau. It is disputed whether the original was in Syriac or in Greek; Nau is decided in favour of the former. Against a questioning disciple called Abida, Bardaisan seeks to show that man's actions are not entirely necessitated by Fate, as the outcome of stellar combinations. From the fact that the same laws, customs and manners often prevail amongst all persons living in a certain district, or through locally scattered living under the same traditions, Bardaisan endeavours to show that the position of the stars at the birth of individuals can have but little to do with their subsequent conduct, hence the title "Book of the Laws of the Countries".

See also
 Gnosticism
 History of Gnosticism
 List of Gnostic sects

References

Sources

 
 Sebastian Brock, Bardaisan, in Sebastian Brock et al. (eds.), Gorgias Encyclopedic Dictionary of Syriac Heritage, Piscataway, Gorgias Press, 2011
 H.J.W. Drijvers, Bardaisan of Edessa, Van Assen, Gorcum, 1966 (reprint: Piscataway, Gorgias Press, 2014, with a new introduction by Jan Willem Drijvers and an updated bibliography)
 
 
 
 
Ilaria Ramelli, Bardaisan of Edessa: A Reassessment of the Evidence and a New Interpretation, Piscataway, Gorgias Press, 2009

External links

 An hymn against Bar Daisan
 
 One of the chapters of Mani's lost Book of Secrets concerned Bar Daisan, according to the list of its contents given by the tenth-century Islamic writer Ibn al-Nadim in his  Encyclopedia.

154 births
222 deaths
Syrian philosophers
Syriac writers
2nd-century Christian theologians
3rd-century Christian theologians
Christianity in Syria
2nd-century people
3rd-century people